The Wallace Building is a nine-story commercial high-rise at 101-11 Main Street in downtown Little Rock, Arkansas.  It was built in 1928 to a design by Little Rock architect George R. Mann, and is an excellent local example of early Art Deco architecture.  It was built by George Washington Donaghey, a former Governor of Arkansas; Mann and Donaghey had previously worked together on the Arkansas State Capitol, with disputes over its construction propelling Donaghey into politics and the governor's seat.  This building is named after his wife's maiden name.

The building was listed on the National Register of Historic Places in 1999.

See also
National Register of Historic Places listings in Little Rock, Arkansas

References

Commercial buildings on the National Register of Historic Places in Arkansas
Art Deco architecture in Arkansas
Skyscraper office buildings in Little Rock, Arkansas
Office buildings completed in 1928